Desislava Zhekova Taneva (Bulgarian: Десислава Жекова Танева), born 9 June 1972, is a Bulgarian politician who is the Minister of Agriculture and Food in the Second Borisov Government.

Career
Born in Sliven, Taneva earned a degree in economics from the UNWE in 1995 and studied law at the Bourgas Free University, graduating in 2001. Between 1997 and 4 July 2009, she served as the executive director of "Mel invest" AD. Taneva has also been for many years the regional leader of  GERB in Sliven.

On 7 November 2014, Taneva assumed her duties as Minister of Agriculture and Food of Bulgaria, succeeding Vasil Grudev.

References

1972 births
Living people
People from Sliven
Agriculture ministers of Bulgaria
Women government ministers of Bulgaria
GERB politicians
Government ministers of Bulgaria
University of National and World Economy alumni